Mockbeggar is a hamlet lying north of the A2 road to the east of Teynham in Swale in Kent, England. It is in the civil parish of Norton, Buckland and Stone.

External links

Villages in Kent
Hamlets in Kent